Yaroslav Sergeevich Nikolaev (April 30, 1899, Šiauliai, Russian Empire — July 1, 1978, Leningrad, USSR) was a Soviet Russian painter, Honored Art worker of Russian Federation (1956), People's Artist of the Russian Federation (1975), a member of the Leningrad Union of Artists, who lived and worked in Leningrad. In 1948-1951 Nikolaev was a head of the Leningrad Union of Soviet Artists, regarded as one of representatives of the Leningrad school of painting, most famous for his genre and historical painting.

See also

 Fine Art of Leningrad
 Leningrad School of Painting
 List of 20th-century Russian painters
 List of painters of Saint Petersburg Union of Artists
 Saint Petersburg Union of Artists

References

Sources 
 Бойков В. Изобразительное искусство Ленинграда. Заметки о выставке ленинградских художников // Ленинградская правда, 1947, 29 ноября.
 Земская М. За правду жизни и большую мысль. К итогам осенней выставки ленинградских художников // Смена, 1954, 18 декабря.
 Днепрова Е. Открылась выставка работ ленинградских художников // Вечерний Ленинград, 1956, 6 декабря.
 1917 — 1957. Выставка произведений ленинградских художников. Каталог. Л., Ленинградский художник, 1958. С.23.
 И. Никифоровская. Итоги большой творческой работы // Вечерний Ленинград. 1957, 10 октября.
 Всесоюзная художественная выставка, посвящённая 40-летию Великой Октябрьской социалистической революции. Каталог. — М: Советский художник, 1957. С.53.
 Недошивин Г. Окрыляющие перспективы. На Всесоюзной художественной выставке // Правда, 1957, 18 декабря.
 К новым большим свершениям // Ленинградская правда. 1958, 12 января.
 Шведова В. Над чем работают ленинградские художники // Художник. 1959, № 9.
 Выставка произведений ленинградских художников 1960 года. Каталог. Л., Художник РСФСР, 1961. С.29.
 На разных континентах // Ленинградская правда, 1961, 26 января.
 Леонтьева Г. В пути // Художник. 1961, № 7. С.9-17.
 Григорьева Н. Всесоюзная художественная // Ленинградская правда, 1963, 26 декабря.
 Бетхер-Остренко И. Художественная летопись истории // Вечерний Ленинград, 1964, 28 января.
 Ленинград. Зональная выставка. — Л: Художник РСФСР, 1965. — с.36.
 Кривенко И. «Ленинград» (раздел живописи) // Художник. 1965, № 3. С.27-36.
 Вторая республиканская художественная выставка «Советская Россия». Каталог. — М: Советский художник, 1965. — с.28.
 Иванов П. Лицо современника // Искусство. 1965, № 8. С.5-10.
 Никифоровская И. Отчитываться мастерством // Ленинградская правда, 1965, 26 ноября.
 Советская Россия. Третья Республиканская художественная выставка. Каталог. — М: Министерство культуры РСФСР, 1967. — с.41.
 Справочник членов Ленинградской организации Союза художников РСФСР. — Л: Художник РСФСР, 1972. — с.37.
 Наш современник. Каталог выставки произведений ленинградских художников 1971 года. — Л: Художник РСФСР, 1972. — с.16.
 Осенняя традиционная // Ленинградская правда, 1971, 11 декабря.
 Яковлева Л. Величие подвига. // Вечерний Ленинград, 1975, 27 мая.
 Наш современник. Зональная выставка произведений ленинградских художников 1975 года. Каталог. — Л: Художник РСФСР, 1980. — с.21.
 И. Мямлин. Сердце с правдой вдвоём… // Ленинградская правда, 1975, 1 июня.
 Изобразительное искусство Ленинграда. Каталог выставки. — Л: Художник РСФСР, 1976. — с.24, 32.
 Осенняя выставка произведений ленинградских художников. 1978 года. Каталог. — Л: Художник РСФСР, 1983. — с.13.
 Справочник членов Союза художников СССР. Т.2. М., Советский художник, 1979. C.128.
 Ярослав Сергеевич Николаев. Сборник материалов и каталог выставки произведений. Л., Художник РСФСР, 1986.
 Связь времён. 1932—1997. Художники — члены Санкт — Петербургского Союза художников России. Каталог выставки. — Санкт-Петербург: ЦВЗ «Манеж», 1997. — с.294.

1899 births
1978 deaths
20th-century Russian painters
Russian male painters
Soviet painters
Socialist realist artists
Leningrad School artists
Members of the Leningrad Union of Artists
Repin Institute of Arts alumni
Russian landscape painters
20th-century Russian male artists